Manjari is a 2013 Nepali film written and directed by Ganesh Dev Panday and starring Gaurav Pahari and Sujata Koirala.

Plot

Ishwor is a motorbike mechanic in Butwal and lives a simple routine life until he meets a young girl named Manjari. Manjari, daughter of a powerful landlord, falls in love with Ishwor for his simplicity irrespective of their differences. Manjari's dad decides to marry her off with another boy who matches their standard in the society. Manjari is upset by this development and goes to meet Ishwor to inform him about her dad's decision. Manjari forces Ishwor to take her away threatening to kill herself if Ishwor fails to comply. Ishwor agrees with her and takes her to Kathmandu.

Cast

 Gaurav Pahari as Ishwor
 Sujata Koirala as Manjari
 Resham Firiri as Homme (Ishwor's Friend)
 Tika Pahari as Manjari's dad
 Bishnu Rijal as Manjari's uncle
 Deepa Pokhrel as Manjari's friend
 Sujan Thapa as Fuchee
 Kopila Thapa as Manjari's mom
 Bidhya Karki as Ishwor's mom

Songs

References

2013 films
Nepalese drama films
Films shot in Kathmandu
Remakes of Nepalese films